The Battle of Dibaltum was fought between a Roman army and an army of Goths, Huns, and Alans in the summer of 377. The battle took place outside the city of Dibaltum in Thrace and resulted in a Gothic victory.

Background
After Saturninus issued the order to withdraw all soldiers from the Haemus Mountains, the Goths passed through from Moesia into Thrace and began pillaging the countryside.  A force of Goths, joined by their new allies the Huns and Alans, left the area of Marcianopolis and travelled south in search of plunder, arriving close to the city of Dibaltum.

Barzimeres, tribunum scutariorum (Commander of the Guards), alongside other generals, had been transferred from the east to Thrace to combat the Goths, and began setting up camp outside Dibaltum upon his arrival. The Roman army consisted of a unit of scutarii cavalry, cornuti, and other units of infantrymen.

Battle
The Goths surprised the Romans as they made camp for the night, and Barzimeres quickly arranged the army into battle formation. The Romans attacked the Goths in an effort to force them to withdraw, and the battle appeared as if it would last until nightfall. A large force of cavalry joined the battle late and surrounded and overwhelmed the Roman army. In the ensuing battle Barzimeres was killed, Equitius, cura palatii (Marshal of the Court), was captured, and most of the Roman army was destroyed.

Aftermath
The Goths, Huns, and Alans sacked Dibaltum, and marched on Beroea to attack the general Frigeridus, but his scouts detected the invaders and Frigeridus promptly withdrew to Illyria. Equitius later managed to escape from captivity.

References

Bibliography

Gothic War (376–382)
Dibaltum
Dibaltum
370s in the Roman Empire
377
Dibaltum
Dibaltum
Military history of Bulgaria
History of Burgas Province